Brigade 2506 (Brigada Asalto 2506) was a CIA-sponsored group of Cuban exiles formed in 1960 to attempt the military overthrow of the Cuban government headed by Fidel Castro. It carried out the abortive Bay of Pigs Invasion landings in Cuba on 17 April 1961.

History

In May 1960, the CIA began to recruit anti-Castro Cuban exiles in the Miami area. For most recruits, infantry training was carried out at a CIA-run base code-named JMTrax near Retalhuleu in the Sierra Madre on the Pacific coast of Guatemala.

In November 1960, with Gregorio Aguilar Matteo spearheading training with 430 men, the leaders were chosen and the group was named Brigade 2506. It was also known as the Blindado Battalion among members, using the membership number of Carlos (Carlyle) Rafael Santana Estevez, who had died in a training accident in September 1960. The principal commanders were appointed as follows:

 Manuel Francisco Artime Buesa: Political leader
 José Alfredo Pérez San Román "Pepe": Military commander
 Erneido Andrés Oliva González: Military second-in-command
 Manuel Villafaña Martínez: Commander of the air force
 Ramón J. Ferrer Mena: Chief of staff
 Enrique Ruíz Williams
 Higinio Nino Díaz
 Francisco Pérez Castro "Brillo": Infantry battalion
 Alejandro del Valle Martí: 1st Paratroop Battalion
 Hugo Sueiro Ríos: 2nd Infantry Battalion
 Noelio Montero Díaz: 3rd Battalion
 Valentín Bacallao Ponte "Pipo": 4th Armoured Battalion
 Ricardo Montero Duque: 5th Infantry Battalion
 Francisco Montiel Maciera Rivera: 6th Infantry Battalion
 Roberto Pérez San Román: Heavy Gun Battalion

About 1,334 men traveled on a seaborne force from Guatemala, of which about 1,297 actually landed in Cuba, plus an additional 177 airborne paratroops. An estimated 114 drowned or were killed in action, and 1,183 were captured, tried and imprisoned. Private sympathizers in the United States eventually negotiated to give $53 million worth of food and medicine in exchange for release and repatriation of Brigade prisoners to Miami starting on 23 December 1962. On 29 December 1962, President John F. Kennedy hosted a 'welcome back' ceremony for captured Brigade 2506 veterans at the Orange Bowl in Miami. Some of its members have gone on to found the Brigade 2506 Veteran's Association, which controls the Bay of Pigs Museum & Library in Miami.

See also
Cuban dissident movement
James B. Donovan
Escambray rebellion

References

 Wyden, Peter: Bay of Pigs - The Untold Story. Simon and Schuster. New York 1979,   .

External links

 Bay of Pigs Veterans Association Brigade 2506
Newsweek article about Brigade 2506

Cuba–United States relations
Cuban Revolution
Opposition to Fidel Castro
Central Intelligence Agency
Guerrilla movements in Latin America
Anti-communist organizations in the United States